Jonathan Mark Foreman (born October 22, 1976)  is an American musician, the lead singer, guitarist, main songwriter and co-founder of the alternative rock band Switchfoot. He started Switchfoot in 1996 with drummer Chad Butler and his brother Tim Foreman on bass guitar. Jerome Fontamillas and Drew Shirley later joined the band.

Personal life 

Foreman was born in San Bernardino County, California, but his family moved to Massachusetts and Virginia Beach during his childhood. There he became fast friends with Todd Cooper, who encouraged him to learn guitar. Cooper was later a guitar tech for Switchfoot, although he left in 2005 to pursue his own musical career.

After several years, Foreman and his family moved back to Southern California, this time settling in San Diego. He graduated from San Dieguito Academy in the North County Coastal area of San Diego, California. Foreman attended UC San Diego and later dropped out to follow his singing career.

Foreman married Emily Masen in 2002, and the couple had a daughter in 2012. The couple welcomed their second child, a son, in June 2018.

One of Foreman's favorite pastimes is surfing, and when not on tour, he resides in Cardiff-by-the-Sea, a small suburb of San Diego, California.

Foreman is a committed nondenominational Christian; however, his goal with Switchfoot has always been to make music for all people. "For us, these songs are for everyone. Calling us 'Christian rock' tends to be a box that closes some people out and excludes them. And that's not what we're trying to do. Music has always opened my mind — and that's what we want."

Foreman's father, Mark, serves as the senior pastor of North Coast Calvary Chapel. His mother is Jan (née Carlton).

Influences 

Foreman cites Elliott Smith, U2, The Police, James Taylor, The Beatles, Radiohead, J.S. Bach, Ronny Jordan, Miles Davis, Keith Green, Nirvana, Johnny Cash, Bob Dylan, and Led Zeppelin as some of his musical influences. In 2001, he was awarded the "Les Paul Horizon Award" for the most promising up-and-coming guitarist at the annual Orville H. Gibson Guitar Awards in Los Angeles.

Side projects 

Besides being the main songwriter for Switchfoot, Foreman has also made musical contributions away from the band, including writing with San Diego/Orange County based singer and songwriter Molly Jenson.  Foreman has also contributed to the books The Art of Being and New Way to be Human, the latter written by producer Charlie Peacock. He also appeared on Relient K's 2007 album, Five Score and Seven Years Ago, lending his vocal talents to the song "Deathbed". In September 2009, Jazz musician Karl Denson released the album "Brother's Keeper" in which two songs were co-written by Foreman, and one song, "Drums of War", was solely written by Foreman. Foreman also provided his vocals in accompaniment with Denson on the song "Drums of War".. He wrote "Running Away from Me" for Meat Loaf's 2010 album Hang Cool Teddy Bear. He collaborated with Ryan O'Neal for the Sleeping at Last song "Birthright".

Fiction Family 

In 2006, Foreman and Nickel Creek member Sean Watkins started collaborating on a duo project originally called "The Real SeanJon", which was later renamed "Fiction Family". Their self-titled debut, Fiction Family, was released on January 20, 2009.

"The album was recorded and written in parts because Nickel Creek and Switchfoot are both hard working, touring acts, we were rarely home from tour at the same time," says Foreman. "Consequently the tracks were passed back and forth between Sean and I. Whoever was home from tour would chip away at the songs with no real expectations at all, mainly just for ourselves and for the love of the song I suppose. We came up with a few cowboy rules for the project: No double tracking. No pussyfooting. No tuning of vocals."

In November 2012, the band released an extended play titled Holiday EP. Their second studio album, Fiction Family Reunion, was released on January 29, 2013.

Solo projects 

Foreman has also worked on various solo projects, independently releasing four EPs, titled Fall, Winter, Spring, and Summer. For the project, Foreman teamed with Credential Recordings in a partnership with Switchfoot's imprint record label, lowercase people records.  In October 2008, Foreman released a collection of songs from his seasonal EPs along with two new tracks. The collection is entitled Limbs and Branches. 

In April 2009, he was GMA Dove Award-nominated for Male Vocalist of the Year.

In November 2014, Foreman announced four EPs under the name The Wonderlands. They are titled Sunlight, Shadows, Darkness and Dawn, and contain 25 songs across the four albums; one for each hour of the day with one extra. They were released in 2015. The records were a collaborative effort, with each song produced by a different producer, and Foreman sending in tracks recorded backstage while on tour. All four EPs were mixed by Future of Forestry's Eric Owyoung.

Songwriting style 

Foreman's songwriting tends to be very dynamic, and he often employs a wide range of different instrumentation, including, but not limited to: guitar, violin, cello, trumpet, mandolin, sitar, flute, saxophone, clarinet, synthesizer, piano, miscellaneous percussion, and harmonica. Foreman has always aimed to use interesting instrumentation when writing for Switchfoot, mostly on some of the band's first albums such as The Legend of Chin, New Way to Be Human, and Learning to Breathe.

Solo discography

Studio albums

Extended plays

Box sets / compilation albums

Singles 

*Original version is on The Wonderlands: Shadows (EP)

Other appearances 

 "Someday We'll Know" (New Radicals cover with Mandy Moore) – Sony – A Walk to Remember Soundtrack (2002)
 "Desire" – Noise Ratchet's Noise Ratchet [EP] (2003)
 "Spirit" – X Worship 2006 (Switchfoot) (2005)
 "Deathbed" – Relient K's Five Score and Seven Years Ago (2007)
 "Do You Only Love The Ones Who Look Like You" – Molly Jenson's Maybe Tomorrow (2009)
 "Your Cheatin' Heart" (Hank Williams cover) – Sony/ATV Nashville Classic Covers: Volume One
 "Birthright" – Sleeping at Last's March EP (2011)
 "O Holy Night" - The Eagle and Child's Christmas, Volume II – EP (2017)
 "When the Walls Come Crashing Down" – Colony House (2020)
 "Don't Know If I Believe It" – Judah. (2020)

Notes

References

External links 

 

1976 births
Living people
American rock guitarists
American male guitarists
American rock singers
Singers from California
Musicians from San Diego
Credential Recordings artists
Grammy Award winners
Switchfoot members
Guitarists from California
University of California, San Diego alumni
21st-century American singers